Linton Mills is a former town in Coshocton County, in the U.S. state of Ohio. The GNIS classifies it as a populated place.

History
Linton Mills had its start when a sawmill was established at the site in 1847. A post office opened at Linton Mills in 1853, and the first postmaster was George Washington Phillips.   It remained in operation until 1901.

References

Geography of Coshocton County, Ohio
Ghost towns in Ohio